Frihedsfonden was founded on May 31, 1945. It was a charity for the families of fallen members of the Danish resistance movement until its dissolution in 1996.

References

External links

World War II non-governmental organizations
Non-profit organizations based in Denmark